Kodi Kushalappa Gowda (born 30 May 1931) is a Kannada scholar, writer, Dravidologist and linguist. He has published over 12 books on linguistics in Kannada and English.

Early life and education 
Born in 1931 at Kodi village near Mercara, Coorg Province, Gowda graduated in Kannada from the University of Madras in 1955 and obtained his master's from the same university in 1956. He obtained his doctorate from Annamalai University in 1963.

Career 
Gowda taught Kannada at the Annamalai University for 18 years and Madras University for 15 years. He has published more than 50 research papers and articles. Gowda was honoured with the Sahitya Academy Award for Kannada in 1987, Karnataka Rajyotsava award, Thimmappayya award and Nirpage award. Gowda headed the University of Madras' Kannada department till 1991. He awarded Karnataka Arebhashe Samskruthi mathu Sahitya Academy in 2019  for his prominent work towards Arebhashe Language. He writes Manasa Bharatha first epic of this Arebhashe Language and Grammar book.

Works

References

External links 
 

1931 births
Living people
20th-century Indian linguists
Academic staff of the University of Madras
People from Kodagu district
Annamalai University alumni
Academic staff of Annamalai University
University of Madras alumni
Kannada-language writers
Scholars from Karnataka